Tommy Kelly was an Irish soccer player during the 1960s, 1970s and 1980s.

A dynamic midfielder, he is quite simply a Bohemian F.C. legend, his career at Dalymount Park spanning 3 different decades. He appeared in a club record 19 games in European competition and won 2 League of Ireland titles.

He joined Bohs in 1965/66 and played as a full back in the "B" team. He made his debut for the first team as a substitute in a 4–1 win over Drogheda on 10 April 1966. He began next season as left back until Bobby Wade returned from injury, whereby Kelly moved into the centre of midfield. It is here where he would remain for the majority of his career. He won the first of his 3 amateur international caps against Wales in October 1966. Bohs finished the 66/67 season as league runners-up and because of their strictly amateur status, they began to lose some of their key players to their professional rivals.

Kelly was among the defectors as he moved to Shamrock Rovers. However, he didn't stay long at Glenmalure Park, as he joined Seán Thomas in America midway through the 1967/68 season. He made one appearance in European competition in his time at Milltown.

In 1968 signed for the Boston Beacons, an embryonic soccer team in the North American Soccer League, Kelly racked up 29 appearances during his only season there.

Tommy signed for St Patrick's Athletic 2 months into the 1968/69 season.

Tommy would soon return to his spiritual home of Dalymount Park, signing again for the "Gypsies" in time for the 1969/70 season. Tommy won the man of the match as Bohs beat Sligo to win the 1970 FAI Cup Final. That cup victory meant that Bohs entered European competition for the first time and Kelly would go on to appear in 19 out of Bohs' first 20 games in Europe. More success followed and he was ever-present in Bohs' League winning campaign of 1974/75. He added another FAI Cup winners medal in 1976 and a 2nd league title was won in 1977/78. Kelly was still going strong as Bohs narrowly missed out on winning the title the following season. With his 39th birthday looming, Tommy hung his boots at the end of the 1981/82 season - his last match was the FAI Cup Final defeat by Limerick.

Tommy Kelly made 575 competitive appearances for Bohemian F.C., scoring 31 goals. He also won League of Ireland XI Representative honours.

His son Ian kelly also played for Rovers and Bohs.

Honours
League of Ireland: 2
 Bohemians - 1974/75, 1977/78
FAI Cup: 2
 Bohemians - 1970, 1976
League of Ireland Cup: 2
 Bohemians - 1975, 1979
3 Irish Amateur International Caps
League of Ireland Representative Team

Trivia
 Tommy hold the record for most appearance for Bohs with 575 competitive appearances
 Tommy was the first man to appear as a substitute in a league game for Bohs when he replaced Turlough O'Connor against Drogheda on 10 April 1966
Tommy is also the uncle by marriage of Arsenal and Irish International John Devine

References

Bohemian F.C. players
Shamrock Rovers F.C. players
St Patrick's Athletic F.C. players
League of Ireland players
Republic of Ireland association footballers
United Soccer Association players
Boston Rovers players
Irish expatriate sportspeople in the United States
Living people
Association football midfielders
Year of birth missing (living people)